Scaphyglottis livida is a species of orchid found from Mexico to tropical South America.

Distribution and Habitat 
S. livida has been found to grow as an epiphyte in gallery forests and on rocks in Cerrado vegetation. Occurrence records in Brazil's states include Parana, Rio de Janeiro, Espirito Santo, Goias, Bahia, Pernambuco, and Ceara.

References

External links

livida
Orchids of Mexico